The Lions' Obelisk, also known as the Obelisk of Lions (Romanian: Obeliscul cu lei) is a historical monument in Copou Park, Iași, Romania.

The construction was built between 1834 and 1841 and is dedicated to the Law of Organic Rules.

Images

Notes 

Historic monuments in Iași County
1841 establishments in Romania
19th-century architecture in Romania